Emily ‘Emmie’ Delany is a former camogie player. She played for University College Dublin (UCD) and was captain of the All Ireland Camogie Championship winning team in 1938 when she scored the fifth of Dublin's five goals in their 5-0 to 2–3 victory over Cork.  Some sources reference her under the name "Emma Emmy Delaney" although her given name was Emily and her family name was Delany with no "e". She won a previous All Ireland senior medal in 1937.

Ashbourne 
She captained UCD to Ashbourne Cup success in 1938.

Personal life 
She married James Lynch on 19 April 1938.  Together they had twelve children:  Máire, Ray, Patricia, John, Denise,  Patrick, Brendan, Francis, Eamonn, Joe, Imelda, & Dominic.

References

External links 
 Camogie.ie Official Camogie Association Website
 Wikipedia List of Camogie players

Dublin camogie players
Year of birth missing
Possibly living people
UCD camogie players